Clean is a 2004 drama film directed by French director Olivier Assayas, starring Maggie Cheung and Nick Nolte. It was jointly funded by Canada, France, and United Kingdom sources. It was released in the United States in 2006.

Plot
Emily Wang (Maggie Cheung), a former video jockey, who has been in a tempestuous relationship for several years with Lee Hauser (played by James Johnston of Nick Cave and the Bad Seeds), a rock musician. Lee's friends feel that Emily is bad for him, describing her as a junkie. Their young son, Jay, is living in Vancouver with Lee's parents.

As the film opens, the pair have arrived in Hamilton, Canada, to see Metric perform. Following an argument in their motel room, Emily walks out and, after taking heroin, falls asleep in her car. When she returns the following morning, she finds that Lee has died of a drug overdose, and the Ontario Provincial Police are investigating. As Emily attempts to force her way into the room, the police find heroin in her bag and she is arrested.

Emily spends six months in jail and, upon release, discovers that custody of her son has been awarded to Lee's parents. She resolves to return to Paris, where she used to live. Before leaving, she briefly meets Albrecht, Lee's father (played by Nick Nolte), who tells her that he would prefer that she not see Jay for a few years.

In Paris, Emily begins work in a Chinese restaurant owned by relatives but does not enjoy it. She has become addicted to methadone and relies on her friends for prescriptions. Meanwhile, Lee's mother, Rosemary (played by Martha Henry) falls ill and she and Albrecht travel to London with Jay for medical treatment. While they are there, Albrecht decides to take Jay to meet Emily, but the boy has been told by his grandmother that Emily was responsible for his father's death and does not want to see her.

Emily eventually decides that she must get clean in order to be able to spend time with her son. She stops taking methadone and prepares for Jay's arrival. When the boy eventually meets her, she takes him to a zoo and explains her relationship with his father and why they took drugs. Emily also has become a singer; when she is given the opportunity arising from meeting a fellow musician in prison, she must make some serious decisions about her life.

Cast

Assayas and Cheung met during the making of Irma Vep in 1996.  They married in 1998 and divorced in 2001.  Clean was their first collaboration since the divorce and their second and currently last since Irma Vep.

Music
The songs that Maggie Cheung performs in the film were written and produced by David Roback of Mazzy Star. The soundtrack also features songs by Brian Eno, Daniel Lanois, Emily Haines, Metric, The Notwist, Britta Phillips and Tricky.

Brian Eno — "An Ending"
Maggie Cheung — "Strawberry Stain"
Brian Eno — "Third Uncle"
Tricky & Liz Densmore — "Breakaway"
Maggie Cheung — "Down in the Light"
Metric — "Dead Disco"
Brian Eno — "Spider and I"
The Notwist — "Neon Golden"
Maggie Cheung — "Wait for Me"
Britta Phillips — "Knives from Bavaria"
Maggie Cheung — "She Can't Tell You"
Metric — "Dead Disco (Live)"

Critical response 
On Rotten Tomatoes, the film has a rating of 73% based on 66 reviews and an average rating of 6.64/10. The consensus statement reads, "In one of her best roles, Cheung gives a believable and arresting performance as a recovering addict." On Metacritic, the film has a score of 75 out of 100 based on 28 reviews, indicating "generally favorable reviews".

Accolades

References

External links

2004 films
2004 drama films
British drama films
French drama films
Canadian drama films
2000s English-language films
English-language French films
English-language Canadian films
Films directed by Olivier Assayas
Films set in Ontario
Films set in Paris
Films about heroin addiction
Films with screenplays by Olivier Assayas
Entertainment One films
Vertigo Films films
2000s Canadian films
2000s British films
2000s French films